Melaleuca lateriflora, commonly known as gorada, is a plant in the myrtle family, Myrtaceae and is endemic to the south-west of Western Australia. It is usually an erect shrub with oval leaves and small clusters of white flowers mainly along the older branches.

Description

The heads occur on the previous year's wood but also at or near the ends of branches. The stamens are in five bundles around the flower, each bundle containing 6 to 13 stamens.

Taxonomy and naming
Melaleuca lateriflora was first formally described in 1867 by George Bentham in Flora Australiensis. The specific epithet (lateriflora) is "in reference to the inflorescences being inserted on the branchlets and branches below the leaves". Until 2010  there were two subspecies - Melaleuca lateriflora subsp. lateriflora  and Melaleuca lateriflora subsp. acutifolia but in 2010 the latter subspecies was raised to species status as Melaleuca acutifolia.

Distribution and habitat
Melaleuca lateriflora occurs from the Yuna  and Mullewa districts east to the Coolgardie district and south to the Stirling Range in the Avon Wheatbelt, Coolgardie, Esperance Plains, Geraldton Sandplains, Jarrah Forest, Mallee, Murchison and Yalgoo biogeographic regions. It grows in sandy and clayey soils on flats, floodplains and swampy areas.

Conservation status
Melaleuca lateriflora is listed as "not threatened" by the Government of Western Australia Department of Parks and Wildlife.

References

lateriflora
Myrtales of Australia
Plants described in 1867
Endemic flora of Western Australia